Glenson Prince (born 17 September 1987) is a Dominican football goalkeeper. As of 2014, he played for northern Bombers FC that competes in the Dominica Premiere League. He is a Dominica international.

Early life

He began playing cricket before beginning football at age 11.

Football career 
San Juan Jabloteh F.C. in September 2014 signed Prince.

He was part of the 2015 Windward Islands Tournament Team.

The last 2018 FIFA World Cup qualification match he played was in the second leg of 2018 FIFA World Cup qualification against Canada.

Education

Prince is a full-time secondary school teacher.

Under the theme of 'Rebuilding Dominica Together' for the annual Dominica 2015 National Youth Rally, he encouraged Dominican youth to participate in more extracurricular sporting activities as proponent of sport. He announced that Dominica was celebrating its 37th year of independence and its theme of recovering "from the ravages of Tropical Storm Erika."

References

External links
 
 

1987 births
Living people
Dominica footballers
Dominica international footballers
Association football goalkeepers
San Juan Jabloteh F.C. players
Dominica expatriate footballers
TT Pro League players
Expatriate footballers in Trinidad and Tobago
Expatriate footballers in Guadeloupe
Dominica expatriate sportspeople in Trinidad and Tobago
Dominica expatriate sportspeople in Guadeloupe
Dominica under-20 international footballers